The Instituto Nacional Electoral (INE) (English  for National Electoral Institute) (formerly Federal Electoral Institute (IFE)) is an autonomous, public agency responsible for organizing federal elections in Mexico, that is, those related to the election of the President of the United Mexican States, the members of the Congress of the Union as well as elections of authorities and representatives at local and state levels. The agency's president is Lorenzo Córdova Vianello, appointed in 2014 for a 9-year tenure.

History

1990–2014

The IFE was formally established on October 11, 1990 after controversies surrounding the 1988 Mexican general election resulted in a series of constitutional reforms approved in 1989 and the Federal Code of Electoral Institutions and Procedures (Cofipe), a law passed in August 1990 and currently in force. The legislative branch of the federal government, the national political parties, and the general citizenry participate in its composition. 

Since its creation, the constitutional and legal regulations in this subject matter have experienced further major reforms, which have affected the composition and details of the IFE. A reform approved in 1996 reinforced the level of independence and autonomy of the IFE by completely dissociating the executive branch from any aspect regarding its membership or functions, and by reserving the vote within all its directive bodies to the councilors, the members that do not have links to any party or to any state power or body. 

IFE had legal personnel and assets of its own.  Its headquarters were located in the Federal District, and it was organized under a decentralized framework that allowed it to exercise its duties throughout the country.

As a result of electoral reforms initiated by President Enrique Peña Nieto, the IFE was dissolved on April 4, 2014, and was supplanted by the National Electoral Institute (INE).

2014–present 
With its creation in 2014, the National Electoral Institute took over all responsibilities of the Federal Electoral Institute. It was also charged with oversight of all elections at local and state level, as well as plebiscites and the regulation of processes of citizen´s participation in public administration. Lorenzo Córdova was appointed chairman of the General Council for a 9-year period starting 2014.

In 2022, President Andrés Manuel López Obrador proposed a reform that would require INE officials to be elected by vote. He contends that the proposal would "allow citizens to select honest people to run elections." The idea is opposed by academics and nongovernmental organizations, viewing it a way to politicize the body with parties steering their supporters to vote for particular candidates for the board.

Political parties and associations
IFE was charged with the registration, funding and oversight of national political parties. Starting 2014, INE was also charged with oversight over local political parties, which before 2014 were registered by each state's Electoral Institute. Rules and guidelines for the registration of political parties are outlined in the Federal Code of Electoral Institutions and Procedures.

In addition, INE registers national political associations, which are intended to assist in the development of democratic life and the country's political culture, as well as being intended to create a better informed public opinion. The creation of a national political association is usually regarded as the first step towards the creation of a full-fledged political party.

Professional Electoral Service
In order to guarantee a professional and specialized performance of its responsibilities, the INE used a special system of recruitment, selection, training, and evaluation of qualified staff to provide electoral services, especially in its fundamental areas, which are the ones directly linked with the preparation and organization of elections.

Redistricting
Since the early 1990s, INE has held the authority to redraw congressional districts, and since 1996, INE has used a redistricting algorithm to redraw congressional districts. The INE Executive Board appoints a technical committee, which is made up of experts in cartography, demography, and statistics. The committee adopts an objective scoring function that includes criteria, such as population equality, compactness, preserving political boundaries, traveling time, and minority representation. Once the scoring function is adopted, the technical committee creates a proposed map using an optimization algorithm. Different optimization algorithms have been used at different times, such as simulated annealing and honeycomb optimization. Political parties have two opportunities to propose changes that score better on the objective scoring function before the committee makes a final recommendation for adoption. The interaction between the political parties and the committee, their proposed maps, and intermediate maps are not publicly available.

Results 
The first electoral process organised by INE was in the period 2014-2015. In total 2,159 candidates were elected at local, state and national levels. The increase in violence against women participating in electoral processes prompted the institution to prepare and adopt, together with other organizations, a protocol to eliminate violence against women in electoral processes.

The 2018 Mexican general election were coined by INE as the biggest electoral process in Mexican history. Over 3,000 positions were to be filled by popular vote. The election results proved to be unprecedented in its scope and impact on Mexico´s political landscape. Despite severe challenges, such as no less than 145 election-related deaths, the 2018 elections were generally considered free and fair.

References

External links
INE website
Federal Electoral Tribunal website
IFE, Now INE
INE directory

1990 establishments in Mexico
2014 disestablishments in Mexico
2014 establishments in Mexico
Mexico
Elections in Mexico